Miniyeh is the capital of the Miniyeh-Danniyeh District in North Governorate of Lebanon.  Minya is located 96 km from Beirut at an altitude of 20 m above sea level.

Notable people 

 Mostafa Matar (born 1995), Lebanese footballer

References

External links
Minieh - Nabi Youcheaa, localiban

Populated places in Miniyeh-Danniyeh District
Populated places in Lebanon